Reynolds Peak is an  mountain summit located in the Methow Mountains, a sub-range of the North Cascades in Washington state. It is protected by the Lake Chelan-Sawtooth Wilderness within the Okanogan–Wenatchee National Forest. The nearest higher neighbor is Oval Peak,  to the southeast. Precipitation runoff on the east side of the mountain drains into the Twisp River via Reynolds Creek, whereas the west side of the mountain drains to the Stehekin River via Boulder Creek.

Climate
Lying east of the Cascade crest, the area around Reynolds Peak is a bit drier than areas to the west. Summers can bring warm temperatures and occasional thunderstorms. With its impressive height, Reynolds Peak can have snow on it in late-Spring and early-Fall, and can be very cold in the winter.

Geology

The North Cascades features some of the most rugged topography in the Cascade Range with craggy peaks, ridges, and deep glacial valleys. Geological events occurring many years ago created the diverse topography and drastic elevation changes over the Cascade Range leading to the various climate differences. These climate differences lead to vegetation variety defining the ecoregions in this area.

The history of the formation of the Cascade Mountains dates back millions of years ago to the late Eocene Epoch. With the North American Plate overriding the Pacific Plate, episodes of volcanic igneous activity persisted.  In addition, small fragments of the oceanic and continental lithosphere called terranes created the North Cascades about 50 million years ago.

During the Pleistocene period dating back over two million years ago, glaciation advancing and retreating repeatedly scoured the landscape leaving deposits of rock debris. The "U"-shaped cross section of the river valleys are a result of recent glaciation. Uplift and faulting in combination with glaciation have been the dominant processes which have created the tall peaks and deep valleys of the North Cascades area.

See also

 List of mountain peaks of Washington (state)
 Geography of the North Cascades
 Geology of the Pacific Northwest

References

External links
 Weather forecast: Reynolds Peak

North Cascades
Mountains of Washington (state)
Mountains of Okanogan County, Washington
Mountains of Chelan County, Washington
Cascade Range
North Cascades of Washington (state)
North American 2000 m summits